Live at the Living Room is a live album by The Three Sounds which was recorded in Cincinnati in 1964 and released on the Mercury label.

Reception

Allmusic's Scott Yanow noted, "This Mercury LP finds the trio mostly sticking to bluesy material, plus a couple of Oscar Peterson tunes ... every song sounds a bit like the blues on this hard-to-find set".

Track listing
All compositions by Gene Harris except where noted
 "Mississippi Mud" (Harry Barris) − 2:28
 "Once in a Lifetime" (Anthony Newley, Leslie Bricusse) − 2:42
 "Hymn to Freedom" (Oscar Peterson, Harriett Hamilton) − 3:46
 "Glory of Love" − 4:05
 "Blues for My Baby" − 4:20
 "Green's" − 3:15
 "Blues" − 5:44
 "Willow Weep for Me" (Ann Ronell) − 6:25
 "Blues for Big Scotia" (Peterson) − 3:01

Personnel
Gene Harris − piano
Andy Simpkins − bass
Bill Dowdy − drums

References

1964 live albums
The Three Sounds live albums
Mercury Records live albums
Albums produced by Quincy Jones